Massey is an unincorporated community in Dubuque County, Iowa, United States.

Notes

Unincorporated communities in Dubuque County, Iowa
Unincorporated communities in Iowa